Mohamed Oumar Konaté (born 20 October 1992) is a Malian professional footballer who plays as a defender for CS Chebba in the Botola. Before 2013, he played for Djoliba de Bamako in Mali.

International career
On 29 June 2014, Konaté made his debut for the Mali national team in a 3–1 win against China in an international friendly.

He was also played at the Under-20 level for Mali.

References

External links

 
 
 .

1992 births
Living people
Association football defenders
Malian footballers
Mali international footballers
Mali under-20 international footballers
2015 Africa Cup of Nations players
2017 Africa Cup of Nations players
Botola players
Djoliba AC players
RS Berkane players
Étoile Sportive du Sahel players
CS Chebba players
Malian expatriate footballers
Expatriate footballers in Morocco
Malian expatriate sportspeople in Morocco
21st-century Malian people